Saint-Ubalde is a rural municipality in Portneuf County in the Canadian province of Quebec.

Geographically its territory is marked by an agricultural and populated area in the south-west, and an undeveloped hilly area in the north-east where there are numerous lakes such as Blanc, Sainte-Anne, Ricard, and Thom. Therefore, its economy is centred on potato cultivation and outdoor recreation (canoeing, water skiing, fishing).

History
Saint-Ubald (originally without an "e") was founded by people from Neuville in 1860, and the Saint-Ubald Mission was established that same year. It was named after Ubald Gingras (1824-1874), first sacristan of the place but originally from Pointe-aux-Trembles (Portneuf), and who was brother-in-law of Charles-François Baillargeon, archbishop of Quebec. The mission became a parish in 1866 by separating from Saint-Casimir. In 1873, the civil parish was formed and incorporated as a parish municipality. A year later, its post office opened.

In 1920, the village centre separated from the parish municipality to form the Village Municipality of Saint-Ubalde. But in 1973, the parish and village municipalities merged again to form the new Municipality of Saint-Ubalde.

Demographics
Population trend:
 Population in 2011: 1403 (2006 to 2011 population change: -3.8%)
 Population in 2006: 1458
 Population in 2001: 1460
 Population in 1996: 1540
 Population in 1991: 1552

Private dwellings occupied by usual residents: 646 (total dwellings: 1015)

Mother tongue:
 English as first language: 0%
 French as first language: 99.3%
 English and French as first language: 0%
 Other as first language: 0.7%

See also
 Portneuf Regional Natural Park

References

External links

Municipalities in Quebec
Incorporated places in Capitale-Nationale
Portneuf Regional County Municipality